Bangladesh Army University of Engineering & Technology (BAUET) is a Government and UGC approved private university operated by the Bangladesh Army. It was established in accordance with the Private University Act (PUA) 2010. The university is situated in Qadirabad Cantonment, Natore District, Rajshahi Division, Bangladesh.

Background 
BAUET started its journey when the Honorable Prime Minister of the People's Republic of Bangladesh, Sheikh Hasina planned to establish institutions of higher learning governed by the armed forces (primarily, the army) in the rural areas of Bangladesh to impart quality tertiary education within reasonable cost. As planned, the Prime Minister gave necessary directions to initiate the establishment of three universities in Saidpur, Natore and Cumilla. Accordingly, the foundation plaque of BAUET was unveiled on 15 August 2014 by Zunaid Ahmed Palak, the Member of Parliament (MP) from Natore-3 constituency and Minister of State for Information and Communication Technology Division, Bangladesh.

Campus 
The university campus is located within the Qadirabad Cantonment. It currently occupies an estimated area of 20 acres. However, there are plans to expand the present land area and procurement of land is currently ongoing. There is a 2-story administrative building, a 8-story academic building and a 5-story annex building in the campus. There are also several grocery shops, a large canteen, a garage and a parking lot inside the campus. There is a large auditorium with a capacity of 1,000 people for holding various programs and events of the university on the top floor of the annex building.

Faculties and departments 
There are currently 5 engineering and 3 non-engineering departments running under 4 faculties at BAUET. These departments mostly offer undergraduate programs as of now with a plan of offering more post-graduate and research programs in the near future. There are also plans to establish more engineering and non-engineering departments under new faculties within the shortest possible time. All of the academic programs of BAUET are approved by the UGC. The structure of the faculties and offered degrees are as follows:

 Faculty of Electrical and Computer Engineering 
 Department of Computer Science and Engineering (CSE)
 Bachelor of Science in Computer Science and Engineering (B.Sc. in CSE)
 Department of Electrical and Electronic Engineering (EEE)
 Bachelor of Science in Electrical and Electronic Engineering (B.Sc. in EEE)
 Department of Information and Communication Engineering (ICE)
 Bachelor of Science in Information and Communication Engineering (B.Sc. in ICE)
 Department of Electronic and Telecommunication Engineering (ETE) (Proposed)
 Bachelor of Science in Electronic and Telecommunication Engineering (B.Sc. in ETE)

 Faculty of Civil and Environmental Engineering 
 Department of Civil Engineering (CE)
 Bachelor of Science in Civil Engineering (B.Sc. in CE)
 Department of Architecture (Proposed)
 Bachelor of Architecture (B.Arch.)

 Faculty of Mechanical and Production Engineering 
 Department of Mechanical Engineering (ME)
 Bachelor of Science in Mechanical Engineering (B.Sc. in ME)
 Department of Apparel Manufacturing Engineering (AME) (Proposed)
 Bachelor of Science in Apparel Manufacturing Engineering (B.Sc. in AME)

 Faculty of Business Studies 
 Department of Business Administration
 Bachelor of Business Administration (B.B.A.)
 Master of Business Administration (M.B.A.)
 Executive Master of Business Administration (E.M.B.A.)

 Faculty of Science and Humanities 
 Department of English
 Bachelor of Arts in English Language and Literature (B.A. in ELL)
 Master of Arts in English Language and Literature (M.A. in ELL)
 Department of Law and Justice
 Bachelor of Law (L.L.B.)
 Department of Physics (Proposed)
 Bachelor of Science in physics (B.Sc. in physics)
 Department of Mathematics (Proposed)
 Bachelor of Science in mathematics (B.Sc. in mathematics)
 Department of Economics (Proposed)
 Bachelor of Social Science in Economics (B.S.S. in economics)
 Department of Sociology (Proposed)
 Bachelor of Social Science in Sociology (B.S.S. in sociology)

Laboratories and classrooms 
BAUET provides modern and state-of-the-art laboratories for the engineering and non-engineering departments. Each department has sufficient laboratories and classrooms. Classrooms are equipped with projectors and touchscreen interactive smart boards, the first of its kind in Bangladesh. State-of-the-art equipment such as function generators, auto-range multimeters, oscilloscopes, electrical machine trainers, survey equipment etc. are available for the students of engineering departments. Laboratories worth-mentioning are:
 Software and Web Engineering Lab
 Mobile Games and Applications Development Lab (Sheikh Russel Lab, funded by the ICT Division)
 Augmented and Virtual Reality Lab
 Computer Networks Lab
 Electrical Circuits Lab
 Digital Logic Design Lab
 Digital Electronics Lab
 Power Electronics Lab
 Very Large Scale Integration (VLSI) Lab
 Electrical Machines Lab
 Telecommunication Engineering Lab
 Solid Dynamics Lab
 Survey Lab
 Soil Test Lab
 Foundry Workshop
 Computer Aided Design Lab

Faculty members 
All of the faculty members of BAUET are graduates of various renowned public universities of Bangladesh. Most of them have a master's degree in their respective fields of study. Also, a good number of PhD holders teach at the university. BAUET recruits the finest minds of the country in order to ensure proper education to its students. Adjunct professors from BUET, RUET, University of Dhaka and University of Rajshahi conduct classes regularly at BAUET. Some of the notable faculty members are:
 Mohammad Kaykobad, Adjunct Professor, Dept. of CSE

Accreditation and ranking 

BAUET is fully approved by UGC and the Government of Bangladesh. It is also on the verge of getting accreditation from the Board of Accreditation for Engineering and Technical Education, Bangladesh and the prestigious Institution of Engineers, Bangladesh. StudyBarta, a popular university ranking website in Bangladesh, puts BAUET in the 41st position among 100 universities in the private university rankings 2020.

Research 
BAUET puts prime importance on research and innovation in order to materialize the vision of Digital Bangladesh. A journal, called the 'BAUET Journal', is published annually in order to preserve the scientific discoveries of the university. Both the students and teachers publish scientific articles regularly in this journal. The university authority provides large amounts of research grants to promising research projects which are conducted at the university. Teachers and students often collaborate on research projects and most of the research works are published in various international conference proceedings and journals. Many of the research works conducted in BAUET have been indexed in Scopus.

Skill development initiatives 
BAUET has taken various steps in order to produce better engineering and non-engineering graduates for the betterment of both individuals and the country. Various skill development programs are held throughout the year, such as:
 Programming contests
 Inter and intra-university tech fairs and fests
 Mobile Games and Applications Development Program (funded by the ICT Division)
 Mock court contest (for law students)
 Internship placements at prestigious national and international organizations
 Workshops and seminars on technology and sustainable development

Extra-curricular activities 
BAUET encourages all sorts of sports and extra-curricular activities on campus. There are several large playgrounds inside the campus and also badminton, volleyball and basketball courts. Sports competitions such as basketball, volleyball, cricket and football championships/tournaments are organised annually. Various cultural programs including debate (both in English and Bangla), recitation contest, public speaking contest, spelling bee etc. are organised throughout the year. Cultural events are staged in the university auditorium, the university fountain yard and also in the recreational square. There are also several clubs to facilitate additional events. These clubs are extremely active throughout the year and they ensure a positive environment for creativity in the university.

Residential facilities 
There is sufficient accommodation facility for both the students and teachers at the university. Dormitories are available both on and off-campus. On-campus living arrangements are facilitated through:
 Boral Hall (for boys)
 Bonolota Hall (for girls)
 Teachers' Complex

There are also many off-campus rented buildings which serve as extra dormitories. These rented dormitories serve to the ever-growing need of accommodation due to the influx of newly admitted students. However, living conditions vary from hall to hall. Most of the modern facilities such as 24/7 Wi-Fi, hot water etc., are available only inside the campus.

Healthcare facilities 
BAUET provides free healthcare facilities to its students and teachers. There is an emergency room with a medical officer and a few nurses inside the campus with dedicated ambulance service also. Advanced healthcare facilities are provided through an affiliated clinic, named 'Mozumdar Clinic'.

Scholarships 
BAUET provides merit scholarship and tuition fee waiver to the children of freedom Fighters, meritorious but poor students from remote and underdeveloped areas and siblings in every semester.

References

External links
  BAUET Official website

Bangladesh Army
Engineering universities of Bangladesh
Technological institutes of Bangladesh
Universities and colleges in Natore District
Educational Institutions affiliated with Bangladesh Army
Educational institutions established in 2015
2015 establishments in Bangladesh